FXYD domain-containing ion transport regulator 3 is a protein that in humans is encoded by the FXYD3 gene.

Function 

This gene encodes a member of a family of small membrane proteins that share a 35-amino acid signature sequence domain, beginning with the sequence PFXYD and containing 7 invariant and 6 highly conserved amino acids. The approved human gene nomenclature for the family is FXYD-domain containing ion transport regulator. Mouse FXYD5 has been termed RIC (Related to Ion Channel). FXYD2, also known as the gamma subunit of the Na,K-ATPase, regulates the properties of that enzyme. FXYD1 (phospholemman), FXYD2 (gamma), FXYD3 (MAT-8), FXYD4 (CHIF), and FXYD5 (RIC) have been shown to induce channel activity in experimental expression systems. Transmembrane topology has been established for two family members (FXYD1 and FXYD2), with the N-terminus extracellular and the C-terminus on the cytoplasmic side of the membrane. The protein encoded by this gene may function as a chloride channel or as a chloride channel regulator. Two transcript variants encode two different isoforms of the protein; in addition, transcripts utilizing alternative polyA signals have been described in the literature.

Model organisms
Model organisms have been used in the study of FXYD3 function. A conditional knockout mouse line called Fxyd3tm1a(KOMP)Wtsi was generated at the Wellcome Trust Sanger Institute. Male and female animals underwent a standardized phenotypic screen to determine the effects of deletion. Additional screens performed:  - In-depth immunological phenotyping

References

Further reading